The 1917–18 season was Galatasaray SK's 13th in existence and the club's 9th consecutive season in the Istanbul Football League (IFL). During World War I, Galatasaray SK's players joined the Ottoman Army. Because of this, Galatasaray SK sometimes could not find any player, sometimes German soldiers merged Galatasaray SK to build a team. Nevertheless, they lost the matches by decision.

Squad statistics

Competitions

İstanbul Football League

Standings

Matches

Friendly Matches
Kick-off listed in local time (EEST)

References
 Futbol, Galatasaray. Tercüman Spor Ansiklopedisi vol.2. (1981) (page 556)
 1917-1918 İstanbul Cuma Ligi. Türk Futbol Tarihi vol.1. page(42). (June 1992) Türkiye Futbol Federasyonu Yayınları.
 Atabeyoğlu, Cem. 1453-1991 Türk Spor Tarihi Ansiklopedisi. page(73).(1991) An Grafik Basın Sanayi ve Ticaret AŞ

External links
 Galatasaray Sports Club Official Website 
 Turkish Football Federation - Galatasaray A.Ş. 
 uefa.com - Galatasaray AŞ

Galatasaray S.K. (football) seasons
Turkish football clubs 1917–18 season
1910s in Istanbul